Hany (also Hani;   "carefree" and "happy" or in Hawaiian "To move lightly; to touch" ) is a masculine Arabic given name, a unisex Hawaiian given name, a Hungarian (a diminutive of Ann),Malay,  Indonesian and Korean feminine given name. It is also a surname.

Given name
 Hani Al-Mazeedi (born 1954), Kuwaiti scientist specializing in halal food
 Hani al-Sibai (born 1961), Egyptian Sunni scholar 
 Hani Hanjour (1972–2001), 9/11 terrorist and hijacker/pilot of American Airlines Flight 77
 Hany Mukhtar (born 1995), German footballer
 Hani Naser (1950–2020), Jordanian-American musician
 Hani Mohsin (1965-2006), Malaysian actor, host and producer 
 Hany Shaker (born 1952), Egyptian singer
 Hany Soh (born 1987), Singaporean politician and lawyer
 Hani Bahjat Tabbara (born 1939), Jordanian diplomat

Surname
 Chris Hani (1942–1993), assassinated South African politician
 Don Hany (born 1975), Australian actor
 Jean Hani (1917–2012), French philosopher
 Nadine Hani (born 1973), Lebanese television presenter

Arabic-language surnames
Arabic masculine given names
Turkish masculine given names